Mountain View is a census-designated place (CDP) in Cibola County, New Mexico, United States. It is located on the Ramah Navajo Indian Reservation. In 2010 the location was listed as the Pinehill census-designated place. It was first listed as the Mountain View CDP prior to the 2020 census.

Demographics

References 

Census-designated places in Cibola County, New Mexico
Census-designated places in New Mexico
Ramah Navajo Indian Reservation